Melica is a genus of perennial grasses known generally as melic or melic grass. They are found in most temperate regions of the world.

Melic grasses are clumping to short-rhizomatous grasses. The spikelets have between one and seven fertile flowers with a rudimentary structure at the distal end composed of one to four sterile florets. Some species of melic have corms, lending them the name oniongrass.

The genus is most diverse in South America and temperate Asia. Eight species are endemic to China. In North America, most species occur west of the Mississippi River, with exceptions being Melica mutica and M. nitens which occur throughout much of the southeast and lower Midwest respectively.

Species
Species and hybrids include:

 Melica altissima L. – Siberian melic grass
 Melica amethystina Pourr.
 Melica animarum Muj.-Sall. & M.Marchi
 Melica argentata É.Desv.
 Melica argyrea Hack.
 Melica aristata Thurb. ex Bol. – bearded melic grass
 Melica arzivencoi Valls & Barcellos
 Melica × aschersonii M.Schulze
 Melica bocquetii Talavera
 Melica bonariensis Parodi
 Melica brasiliana Ard.
 Melica brevicoronata Roseng.
 Melica bulbosa Porter & J.M.Coult. – oniongrass
 Melica californica Scribn. – California melic grass
 Melica canariensis W.Hempel
 Melica capillaris Sol.
 Melica cepacea (Phil.) Scribn.
 Melica chilensis J.Presl
 Melica ciliata L. – hairy melic, silky spike melic
 Melica commersonii Nees ex Steud.
 Melica cupani Guss.
 Melica decipiens Caro
 Melica dendroides Lehm.
 Melica eligulata Boiss.
 Melica eremophila Torres
 Melica frutescens Scribn. – woody melicgrass
 Melica fugax Bol. – little oniongrass
 Melica geyeri Munro ex Bol. – Geyer's oniongrass
 Melica glabrescens (Torres) Torres
 Melica grandiflora Koidz.
 Melica harfordii Bol. – Harford's oniongrass
 Melica × haussknechtii  W.Hempel
 Melica hunzikeri Nicora
 Melica hyalina Döll
 Melica imperfecta Trin. – smallflower melic
 Melica kozlovii Tzvelev
 Melica lilloi Bech.
 Melica longiflora Steud.
 Melica longiligulata Z.L.Wu
 Melica macra Nees
 Melica minor Hack. ex Boiss.
 Melica minuta L. – small melic
 Melica mollis Phil.
 Melica montezumae Piper – Montezuma melic
 Melica mutica Walter – two-flower melic grass
 Melica nitens (Scribn.) Nutt. ex Piper – three-flower melic grass
 Melica nutans L. – mountain melic; nodding melic
 Melica onoei Franch. & Sav.
 Melica pappiana W.Hempel
 Melica parodiana Torres
 Melica patagonica Parodi
 Melica paulsenii Phil.
 Melica penicillaris Boiss. & Balansa
 Melica persica Kunth
 Melica picta K.Koch
 Melica poecilantha É.Desv.
 Melica porteri Scribn.
 Melica przewalskyi Roshev.
 Melica racemosa Thunb.
 Melica radula Franch.
 Melica rectiflora Boiss. & Heldr.
 Melica rigida Cav.
 Melica riograndensis Longhi-Wagner & Valls
 Melica sarmentosa Nees
 Melica scaberrima (Nees ex Steud.) Hook.f.
 Melica scabra Kunth
 Melica scabrosa Trin.
 Melica schafkati Bondarenko
 Melica schuetzeana W.Hempel
 Melica secunda Regel
 Melica serrana Muj.-Sall. & M.Marchi
 Melica smirnovii Tzvelev
 Melica smithii (Porter ex A.Gray) Vasey – Smith's melicgrass
 Melica spartinoides L.B.Sm.
 Melica spectabilis Scribn. – purple oniongrass
 Melica stricta Bol. – rock melic grass
 Melica stuckertii Hack.
 Melica subflava Z.L.Wu &
 Melica subulata (Griseb.) Scribn. – Alaska oniongrass
 Melica tangutorum Tzvelev
 Melica taylorii W.Hempel
 Melica teneriffae Hack. ex Christ
 Melica tenuis Arechav.
 Melica × thuringiaca  Rauschert
 Melica tibetica Roshev.
 Melica torreyana Scribn. – Torrey's melic
 Melica transsilvanica Schur
 Melica turczaninowiana Ohwi
 Melica × tzvelevii  W.Hempel
 Melica uniflora Retz.
 Melica violacea Cav.
 Melica virgata Turcz. ex Trin.
 Melica × weinii  W.Hempel
 Melica yajiangensis Z.L.Wu

References

 
Poaceae genera
Grasses of Africa
Grasses of Asia
Grasses of Europe
Grasses of North America
Grasses of Oceania
Grasses of South America
Taxa named by Carl Linnaeus